GlobalEye is a multi-role airborne early warning & control (AEW&C) platform from Swedish defence and security company Saab. GlobalEye consists of a suite of sensors using Saab's Erieye ER (Extended Range) radar and mission system, installed in the Bombardier Global 6000/6500 long-range business jet.

Development 

During February 2016, Swedish defence company Saab announced the launch of a programme to integrate a variant of their Erieye radar system upon the Canadian Bombardier Global 6000, a long range business jet, to produce a specialised airborne early warning & control (AEW&C) aircraft. This platform is commonly referred to as GlobalEye. Saab stated that the launch was in response to expressions of interest from potential customers. Prior to the development of the GlobalEye, Saab had fitted the Erieye onto several separate AEW platforms, including the Swedish Saab 340 AEW&C and the Brazilian Embraer R-99. To facilitate the programme, Saab secured a supplemental type certificate, authorising the modification of the existing Global 6000 to the GlobalEye configuration.

The manufacturing process involves the delivery of fully completed Global 6000s to Saab's facility in Linköping, where they undergo an extensive conversion process. Modifications include the strengthening of both the airframe and wing, enabling the carriage of the Erieye radar along with other sensors and wingtip-mounted equipment for electronic warfare purposes. Aerodynamic changes include the adoption of an extended tailfin, along with several ventral strakes located beneath the rear fuselage. Additional power and cooling equipment is also fitted. To improve survivability, a self-protection suite comprising laser and radar warning receivers, as well as countermeasures dispensers, is installed. In early 2018, Saab observed that it could produce up to three GlobalEyes per year and could commence deliveries within three years of receiving a contract.

On 23 February 2018, Saab unveiled the first GlobalEye surveillance aircraft; days later, it commenced ground testing in advance of the type's first flight. On 14 March 2018, the first GlobalEye conducted its maiden flight from Linköping; flown by Saab experimental test pilot Magnus Fredriksson, this first flight lasted for 1 hour and 46 minutes. By July 2018, the flight test programme was focused on expanding the aircraft's flight envelope; according to Saab's vice-president of airborne surveillance systems Lars Tossman, the first aircraft was being flown "more or less every day", and that no surprises had been uncovered during these flights. On 3 January 2019, the second aircraft performed its first flight. During May 2019, Saab stated that it was nearing the end of the flight testing phase relating to certification.

Design 

The primary sensor of the GlobalEye is its Erieye ER airborne early warning (AEW) radar; weighing approximately 1 tonne, it is mounted atop the twinjet's fuselage. Saab has cited up to 450 km (216 nm) range for the AEW radar system when flown at an operating altitude of 30,000 ft; and 550 km at 35,000 ft in comparison with earlier versions of the Erieye radar, Saab claims it has achieved a 70% increase in detection range, achieved via the use of new technology, such as gallium nitride transmit/receive modules. According to Saab Group, the GlobalEye is capable of detecting and tracking a combination of airborne and surface targets, the latter on both land and sea, while mission times of up to eleven hours in duration are possible.

In addition to the AEW radar, the GlobalEye is equipped with various additional sensors. These include the Seaspray 7500E maritime surveillance radar, provided by Italian defence conglomerate Leonardo; the Seaspray radar features synthetic-aperture radar and ground-oriented moving target indication modes. The GlobalEye also has an electro-optical/infrared sensor, which is situated underneath the forward fuselage. Other mission equipment includes data links, voice and satellite communications and a command and control suite, the latter comprising five onboard operator stations. The GlobalEye can be operated without any onboard operators, streaming its surveillance output to ground-based stations instead. GlobalEye can simultaneously perform airborne, maritime and ground surveillance duties. It has been offered with three layers of capability: the baseline AESA and C2 system for air, land and sea surveillance, along with some electronic intelligence functions; a version with additional infrared and sea-search functionality; and one with a dedicated signals intelligence (SIGINT) system.

Operational history 

During November 2015, the United Arab Emirates ordered the system, which it refers to as the Swing Role Surveillance System (SRSS), as part of a US$1.27 billion deal. During February 2017, the UAE exercised an option to procure an additional third GlobalEye in a deal worth US$238 million. According to UAE air force chief Ibrahim Naser Al Alawi, the GlobalEye should be a "strong force multiplier...an early warning radar which is capable also of detecting ballistic missiles, and to cover the whole domain as an air power". By May 2019, lead elements, including ground control stations, had been delivered to the UAE. The UAE took delivery of its first Globaleye as per schedule on 29 April 2020 and the second delivery 30 September 2020 the third was delivered 20 February 2021 On 4 January 2021, Saab announced that it had received a follow on contract with the United Arab Emirates regarding the sale of two GlobalEye systems. The order value is US$1.018 billion and the contract period is 2020–2025.

Operators

Current operators

  United Arab Emirates Air Force: Currently operates 3 GlobalEye aircraft with an additional 2 on order scheduled for delivery in 2025.

Future operators
 Swedish Air Force: On 30 June 2022, SAAB and the Swedish Defence Materiel Administration (FMV) signed a contract for the acquisition of 2 GlobalEye aircraft, to be designated S 106 in Swedish service. The deal is valued at 7.3 billion SEK (US$710 million) and deliveries are scheduled for 2027. The contract also includes the option to procure up to 2 additional GlobalEye aircraft.

Potential operators
 Hellenic Air Force: presented by SAAB as a replacement for its existing Erieye fleet.

Failed bids 

  Finnish Air Force: Saab was offering two GlobalEye aircraft in addition to 64 Gripen E/F as part of its bid for the Finnish HX Fighter Program. From 30 January to 6 February 2020 GlobalEye participated in HX Challenge flight evaluations flying to Finland from Linköping in Sweden with a Finnish Air Force delegation on board.

References

Aircraft radars
Military radars of Sweden
Saab